Yulia Zapotichnaya is a Russian football defender. Currently playing for Zenit in the Top Division. She previously played for FC Chertanovo, SKA Rostov, Lada Togliatti and Energiya Voronezh in the Russian women's football championship.

She was a member of the Russian national team.

References

1989 births
Living people
Russian women's footballers
Women's association football defenders
FC Lada Togliatti (women) players
FC Energy Voronezh players
ZFK Zenit Saint Petersburg players
21st-century Russian women